Paulson is a patronymic surname.

Paulson may also refer to:
 Paulson Stadium, Statesboro, Georgia, USA
 Paulson (band), band from New Jersey, USA
 Paulson Plan, see Emergency Economic Stabilization Act of 2008
 Paulson, Manitoba, Canada

See also
 Paulsen (disambiguation)